Ten of Wands is a Minor Arcana Tarot card of the Suit of Wands.

Tarot cards are used throughout much of Europe to play tarot card games.

In English-speaking countries, where the games are largely unknown, Tarot cards came to be utilized primarily for divinatory purposes.

Divination usage

Most often, the Ten of Wands card carries the meaning of overload and burdening situations where too much responsibility has been taken on by the subject.

Key Meanings
The key meanings of the Ten of Wands:
Burdens
Challenges
Intense pressure
Oppression
Overcommitment

Rider–Waite symbolism

 A person overburdened by his enterprise, is nevertheless active and on the move, but not seeing past his wands (or obligations).
 A city can be observed in the background. He may be headed there, perhaps with the goal of ridding himself of this load.

References

Suit of Wands